Micraspis is a genus of fungi in the family Micraspidaceae. The genus contains three species.

References

Helotiaceae